Sam Houston Math, Science, and Technology Center (SHMSTC) is a high school located in the Hawthorne Place and Timber Garden subdivisions, in  Houston, Texas, United States. Sam Houston Math, Science, and Technology Center handles grades nine through twelve and is part of the Houston Independent School District. Before 1955, it was located in Downtown Houston.

Established in 1889, Sam Houston operates the oldest high school newspaper in Texas, the Aegis. Additionally, the school boasts the world's first female-only military drill squad initially known as the Black Battalion but now called the Tigerettes.

The school is often referred to simply as "Sam" by students, alumni, and faculty.
 

History

It was founded in Downtown Houston in 1878 as Houston Academy. Since then, it had several name changes.
 Houston Academy: 1878 to 1881
 Clopper Institute: 1881 to 1886
 Houston Normal School: 1886 to 1895
 Houston High School: 1895 to 1926
 Central High School: 1926 to 1955
 Sam Houston High School: 1955 to 2008 (also referred to as Sam Houston Senior High School)
 Sam Houston Math, Science, and Technology Center: 2008 to now

Until the 1950s the block bordered by Austin, Capitol, Caroline, and Rusk in Downtown Houston housed the institutions that make up what is now Sam Houston High School. Houston Academy was there in the 1850s. In 1894 Central High School was built. J.R. Gonzales of the Houston Chronicle said that the school was "[d]escribed as one of the finest high schools in this part of the country" and "also attracted negative attention for its incredible cost." The school had a price tag of $80,000, $1.9 million in 2010 dollars. In March 1919 the school burned down. A new Sam Houston opened two years later.

According to a 1936 Houston Chronicle article, Sam Houston was to be renamed after Dick Dowling, while the Sam Houston name would be taken by a new high school in southwestern Houston. This did not occur, and the school remained named after Sam Houston.

In 1955, Houston High School moved from its Capitol Street location in Downtown to its current location. The previous Sam Houston High School became the Houston Independent School District administrative headquarters. In July 1970 the first Hattie Mae White Administration Building became the new HISD administrative offices. The Downtown Sam Houston building was demolished. As of 2011 a parking lot owned by HISD now occupies that site. A historical marker is on the south side of that block. In meetings it had been proposed as a new location for the High School for the Performing and Visual Arts.

Sam Houston has Texas' oldest high school newspaper, the Aegis, started in 1889.  In addition, the world's first girls' Military Drill Squad (formerly known as the Black Battalion, but now called the Tigerettes) originated at the school.

Sam Houston was previously reserved for white children (Hispanics being categorized as white prior to 1970) but it desegregated by 1970.

Today, it has a mostly Hispanic student body.

The names of the individual schools currently occupying the Sam Houston campus were chosen in 2008.

On Saturday February 12, 2011, a state historic marker was dedicated at Sam Houston. The Oran M. Roberts Chapter 440 of the United Daughters of the Confederacy organized the event. Lynna Kay Shuffield, the president of the chapter, wrote a historical narrative about the school and its former location in Downtown.

The Reconstruction of the Campus started in late 2016 and its estimated completion would be in 2019.

The Sam Houston Tiger football team holds the distinction of having the both the longest active and all time district game losing streak in the entire state of Texas with 99 consecutive losses in district play as of 2021.

Rating

Sam Houston, with Jack Yates High School and Kashmere High School, are the three high schools in Houston ISD that were consistently low-performing in test scores from 2001 to 2004. Because of this problem, there were movements to have the state or another organization take over the schools for a period so the test scores will be at acceptable levels. While Yates got an acceptable rating in 2005, Houston and Kashmere continued to get unacceptable ratings. Abelardo Saavedra, the superintendent of HISD, described Houston as being "close" to getting an acceptable rating. In August 2006 the school learned that it again got an unacceptable rating from the Texas Education Agency. HISD threatened to close Sam Houston. Sam Houston was not closed and it received another unacceptable rating from the TEA. Houston ISD, stated that the board would consider spending $300,000 to find a method to improve Sam Houston's marks from the TEA.

In 2008 the Texas Education Agency Commissioner Robert Scott ordered the closure of Sam Houston; the Houston Chronicle said that HISD would likely replace 75% of the teachers and change the name of the school. The campus now houses Sam Houston Math, Science, and Technology Center for 2010–2012 and a ninth grade academy. The administration hopes that the changes would cause Sam Houston to get an acceptable rating.

In 2007, an Associated Press/Johns Hopkins University study referred to Sam Houston as a "dropout factory" where at least 40% of the entering freshman class does not make it to their senior year.

Student body
During the 2005–2006 school year, the school had 2,678 students.
 91% were Hispanic American
 6% were African American
 3% were White American
 Less than 1% were Asian American

No Native Americans were enrolled during that school year.

Approximately 89% of the students qualified for free/reduced lunch.

Neighborhoods served by Sam Houston
Several areas of Houston outside of the 610 Loop that are far north of Downtown and south of Aldine are zoned to Sam Houston.

Neighborhoods include Melrose Park, Hardy Acres, Hardy Heights, Assumption Heights, Roos Acres, Virginia Acres, Sunnyland Farms, Oakwood, and Northline Terrace.

Two Houston Housing Authority public housing complexes, Heatherbrook Apartments and Oxford Place, are zoned to the school.

Some small sections of unincorporated Harris County are zoned to Sam Houston High School.

Feeder patterns
Elementary schools that feed into Sam Houston include:
 Barrick
 Burbank
 Coop
 DeChaumes
 Durkee
 Janowski
 Lyons
 Moreno
 Northline
 Scarborough
(partial)
 Berry
 Garcia
 Herrera
 Kennedy
 Osborne

All of Fonville Middle School-zoned areas and some areas of the Burbank Middle and Henry Middle School zones feed into Sam Houston.

Notable alumni

 Melvin Baker: American football player
 Joe Bowman: Class of 1943, bootmaker and marksman.
 William Goyen, novelist (when it was Central High School)
 Jack Valenti: former president of the Motion Picture Association of America, special assistant to US President Lyndon B. Johnson.

Notable faculty
 Lyndon B. Johnson: 36th president of the United States (1963–1969), taught public speaking in 1930.

See also

References

External links

 Sam Houston Math, Science, and Technology Center
 Mellon, Ericka. "Success or just smoke and mirrors?" Houston Chronicle. May 9, 2010.

1878 establishments in Texas
Educational institutions established in 1878
Houston Independent School District high schools
Public high schools in Houston
Sam Houston
Relocated schools